Little Sutton was one of the four constituent medieval villages of Chiswick, in what is now West London, and the site of a royal manor house, Sutton Manor, later Sutton Court. The great house was accompanied by a small hamlet without a church of its own.

The manor was used by four kings of England, Richard II, Henry IV, Henry V, and Henry VI, and Mary, Oliver Cromwell's daughter, lived there. The name survives in local street and house names.

Geography 

Much of the area was still rural until late in the 19th century. Little Sutton, one of the four constituent villages of Chiswick, was about the centre of the parish of Chiswick at that time; Strand-on-the-Green lies to the west, Old Chiswick to the east, and Turnham Green to the north. It is now part of the Grove Park district.

History

Sutton Manor 

Sutton Manor is recorded from 1181. The lands of Sutton and Chiswick had by then already been given as an endowment for the Bishop of London and St Paul's Cathedral. It consisted of about half a square mile of arable fields and small areas of meadow and woods. In 1458 it had its own watermill. It was a Crown holding in the 14th and 15 centuries; in 1396, king Richard II built a royal residence here, complete with a chapel, a hall, and a moat. The house was used by kings Henry IV and Henry V; Henry VI used a later house from at least 1441–1443. Others who used the house included Sir Thomas More, Lord High Chancellor to Henry VIII, in 1524; the speaker of the House of Commons Chaloner Chute, in 1639; and Thomas Belasyse, Viscount Fauconberg in 1675; his wife, Mary, Oliver Cromwell's daughter, lived in the house until 1713, and is buried in St Nicholas Church, Chiswick. By 1589 the great house was accompanied by farm buildings, a malthouse, and a gatehouse, with 3 acres of gardens and orchards. By 1674 the walled garden extended to 12 acres, and by 1691 the gardens included a bowling green and a maze. The field around the old moated enclosure was called Berry-gates until at least 1818. for "gated burh", a fortified place; the name survives in the nearby Barrowgate Road.

Sutton Court

In 1795 the house was remodelled as Sutton Court; it stood to the south of the former moated house, at what is now the corner of Sutton Court Road and Fauconberg Road. In 1845 it served as a boy's boarding school, run by Frederick Tappenden. It was demolished and replaced by the "Sutton Court Mansions" block of flats in 1905.

Little Sutton 

Little Sutton was never more than a small hamlet without a church; by 1703 there were some almshouses, and there appears to have been an inn named the Queen's Head, documented in 1722 and 1862 (if they were the same building). It was simply named Sutton in 1181; this developed into "Sutton Chiswick" or "Sutton by Chiswick" in the 14th and 15th centuries; "Sutton Beauregard" in the 1450s, for the view south over the river to the Surrey hills when the manor (later called Sutton Court) belonged to the Crown; and finally Little Sutton by 1590. By 1801 there were 14 houses in Little Sutton. One building, the 1676 Little Sutton Cottage, survives on Sutton Lane South, facing the main A4 dual carriageway; it is now Grade II listed. The village inn, the Queen's Head, now called the Hole in the Wall, is on Sutton Lane North, just across the A4. The building, much altered in 1925, dates from 1676.

References

Sources

 
 

 
 

Areas of London
Districts of the London Borough of Hounslow
Places formerly in Middlesex